LPA may refer to:

Groups, organizations, companies
Argentine Patriotic League (Liga Patriótica Argentina)
Lao People's Army
Liberal Party of Australia
Libertarian Party of Alabama, USA
Lieutenants Protection Association, an association of junior army officers 
Lincoln Park Academy, a school in Florida
 Live Performance Australia, which organises the Helpmann Awards
Little People of America, supports people with dwarfism 
Local planning authority, UK
Logic Programming Associates, a software company 
London Psychogeographical Association

Biochemistry
L-Phenylalanine
Lipoprotein(a) or Lp(a), a human gene
Lysophosphatidic acid, involved in cell proliferation and Rho signalling

Transportation
Gran Canaria International Airport, Spain, IATA code
LPA (Landing Platform, Amphibious), US Navy Attack transport ship or Amphibious transport dock, an Auxiliary Personnel ship.

Other
Label propagation algorithm, a semi-supervised machine learning algorithm
Lasting power of attorney in English law

See also